Seán Cleary (born 1942 in Ballygar, County Galway) is an Irish former sportsperson. He played Gaelic football with his local club Ballygar and was a member of the Galway senior inter-county team from 1963 until 1969.

References

1942 births
Living people
Ballygar Gaelic footballers
Galway inter-county Gaelic footballers
Connacht inter-provincial Gaelic footballers